"Ready or Not" is a song by German dance band R.I.O., featuring vocals from Pop, R&B and Hip-Hop singer U-Jean. The song was released in Germany as a digital download on 10 May 2013. The song has charted in Austria, Germany and Switzerland. The song was written by Yann Peifer, Manuel Reuter and Andres Ballinas.

Music video
A music video to accompany the release of "Ready or Not" was first released onto YouTube on 10 May 2013 at a total length of three minutes and thirty-three seconds.

Track listing

Chart performance

Weekly charts

Release history

References

2013 singles
R.I.O. songs
2013 songs
Songs written by DJ Manian
Songs written by Yanou
Kontor Records singles
Songs written by Andres Ballinas